John Edwards (16 August 1928 – 29 December 2002) was an Australian cricketer. He played 32 first-class cricket matches for Victoria between 1955 and 1960.

Edwards was Australian team manager in the late 1970s and early 1980s. Interviewed several hours after the famous Lillee Miandad incident at Perth in 1981, Edwards said he got on famously with Lillee and he was a pleasure to work with. He said Lillee was a volatile fellow, who caused team management a bit of stress over the aluminium bat incident in the 1979-80 test against England, but overall he spoke well of Lillee.

See also
 List of Victoria first-class cricketers

References

External links
 
   https://www.youtube.com/watch?v=4sfg3CK4PN8&t=215s

1928 births
2002 deaths
Australian cricketers
Victoria cricketers
Cricketers from Melbourne